Vitol is a Swiss-based multinational energy and commodity trading company that was founded in Rotterdam in 1966 by Henk Viëtor and Jacques Detiger. Though trading, logistics and distribution are at the core of its business, these are complemented by refining, shipping, terminals, exploration and production, power generation, and retail businesses. Vitol has 40 offices worldwide and its largest operations are in Geneva, Houston, London, and Singapore.

With revenues of $279 billion in 2021,  Vitol is the largest independent energy trader in the world, and would be the sixth-largest company worldwide as measured by revenue on the Fortune Global 500 list. Given the secrecy, Vitol maintains around all its business activities and the limited nature of its statutory disclosures, it is excluded from rankings. The company, however, does provide some more financial information to its lenders and to a few other entities with which it trades. The company ships more than 350 million tonnes of crude oil per year and controls 250 supertankers and other vessels to move it around the world. On average it handles more than 7.6 million barrels a day of oil and products  - roughly equivalent to the daily consumption of Japan - the world's fourth-largest oil consumer after the United States, China, and India.

Vitol is a privately held company by about 400 partners who are current and former employees, who are known for their intense culture of privacy and secrecy from both competitors and the general public. It is reported that Vitol made a payout of $2.9 billion to all its partners in 2021.

Activities

Trading

In addition to the global crude and product trading businesses, the company trades coal, natural gas, power,  ethanol, methanol, gasoline, LNG, LPG, naphtha, bitumen, base oils and carbon emissions.

Terminals and infrastructure

In total, Vitol has around 16 million cubic meters of storage capacity across the globe.

Vitol (45% stake), along with IFM Investors (45% stake) and Abu Dhabi National Oil Company (10% stake), own VTTI B.V., a storage and terminals business with a capacity of around 8.7 million cubic meters (MCM) in 11 countries: Netherlands (1.328 MCM + 1.118 MCM), Latvia (1.195 MCM), UAE (1.180 MCM), Belgium (0.965 MCM), Malaysia (0.893 MCM), Cyprus (0.544 MCM), USA (0.452 MCM), Argentina (0.218 MCM), Kenya (0.111 MCM), Russia (0.049 MCM), Nigeria (0.016 MCM). MISC Berhad held a 50% stake in VTTI from May 2010 until August 2015. In April 2022, Vitol announced its intention to stop trading Russian petrol by the end of 2022 due to International sanctions during the Russo-Ukrainian War.

In January 2012, Vitol acquired a stake in a subsidiary of the South African shipping firm Grindrod, which gives it access to a coal terminal in Mozambique.

Refining

In addition to offices in Dubai and Bahrain, Vitol's key strategic asset in the Middle East is the Fujairah Refinery Company Limited (FRCL), which operates an 82,000 barrel per day refinery and a 1,034,000 cubic meter tank farm. FRCL has further development plans in place, which include a 140,000 cubic meter expansion of the tank farm, refurbishment of existing refining units and the installation of additional processing units. Vitol also has invested in refining assets in Bayernoil (Germany),  Cressier (Switzerland), Antwerp (Belgium) and the Geelong refinery near Melbourne (Australia). In 2018, Vitol bought the 85,000 barrel per day Rotterdam Condensate Splitter from Koch Industries.

Exploration and production

Vitol, through its wholly owned subsidiaries Arawak Energy Limited and Vitol E&P, has interests in various exploration and production projects worldwide. Arawak Energy is mainly focused on the FSU where it produces oil and gas in Ukraine, Kazakhstan and Azerbaijan, while Vitol E&P holds a portfolio of exploration and development assets along the West African Transform Margin in Ghana and the Ivory Coast.

In February 2014, it was reported that Vitol, in concert with the Abu Dhabi Investment Council, had bought the downstream businesses of Shell Australia (excluding aviation) for a total of approximately AU$2.9 billion. The purchase included Shell's Geelong Refinery and its 870-site retail business, along with its bulk fuels, bitumen, chemicals and part of its lubricants businesses in Australia. The business trades as Viva Energy, although the Shell brand remains on many of its retail products.

Further, in January 2015, Vitol in collaboration with Eni signed a $7 billion agreement with the government, for the production of oil and gas at Cape Three Points in Western Region of Ghana. The contract is expected to help meet Ghana's burgeoning energy needs.

Aviation

Vitol Aviation is focused on Europe, North America and Africa, serving the world’s largest airlines and military customers with 5.7 million tonnes of jet fuel a year into wing.

Power

In 2013, Vitol invested in its first power plant, VPI Immingham in the UK.  The combined heat and power plant (CHP) is one of the largest of its kind in Europe, capable of generating 1,240 MW and up to 930 tonnes of steam per hour which is used by nearby refineries. The gas-fired plant provides approximately 2.5% of UK peak electricity demand.

Renewable 
In 2021, Vitol had 1.2 GW of renewable power generation currently operational, planned & with further investments across the energy spectrum.

Figures 
In 2018, Vitol traded:
 Oil: 367 million tonnes of crude oil and product sales
 Natural Gas: over 20 billion cubic meters of physical gas globally
 LPG: 14 million tonnes
 Naphtha: 15 million tonnes
 Gasoline: 1 million barrels of physical gasoline traded per day
 Coal: over 30 million tonnes
 Power: 93 TWh of power sales contracted
 Carbon: 49 mm tonnes of contracted carbon volume
 Methanol: 1.4 million tonnes
 Chemicals: 4 million tonnes (Benzene and Paraxylene)

Controversies 
A 2001 article in The Observer stated that in 1995 Vitol had secretly paid US$1 million to Serbian war criminal Arkan to settle a deal with a Serbian Oil company, Orion. Vitol has denied all charges, arguing that no government agency has ever prosecuted the company in this respect.

In 2007, Vitol pleaded guilty to grand larceny in a New York court for paying surcharges to Iraq's national oil company during Saddam's regime and circumventing the UN oil-for-food program. Vitol subsequently paid $17.5 million in restitution for its actions.

According to an article in the Financial Times, Vitol was the company to organise the first controversial sale of Libyan rebel oil to Tesoro Corporation in early April 2011. According to the Financial Times, the company was approached by the Qatari national oil company to sell a cargo of crude oil supplied by the Libyans in exchange for technological supplies and fuel for the National Transitional Council of Libya.

In September 2012, an article in Reuters alleged that the company had bought and sold Iranian fuel oil, bypassing an EU embargo against Tehran. Vitol bought 2 million barrels using a ship-to-ship transfer off the coast of Malaysia from a National Iranian Tanker Company vessel and sold it to Chinese traders. The article stated that as Vitol is based in Switzerland, which did not implement Western sanctions, Vitol had skirted the charges.

In 2013, The Telegraph alleged that the company had been using, for over a decade, an Employee Benefit Trust, avoiding paying income tax for its UK staff.

In 2018, The Dispute Settlement and Sanctions Committee of CRE, the French Energy Regulatory Commission, fined VITOL S.A. €5 million for engaging in market manipulation on the French Southern virtual Gas Trading Point (“PEG Sud”) between 1 June 2013 and 31 March 2014. Vitol appealed this decision, but the French Council of State confirmed the sanction in June 2021.

In 2020, Vitol Inc. agreed to pay a combined total criminal penalty of $135 million to resolve bribery charges with law enforcement authorities in the United States and Brazil. The resolution arises out of Vitol schemes to pay bribes to officials in Brazil, Ecuador and Mexico.

Vitol Asia Pte Ltd 
Vitol Asia Pte Ltd operates as an energy and commodities company, and offers refining, trading, shipping, and storage of crude oil and energy products.

The company was founded in April 1990 and is headquartered in Singapore. The CEO is Hui Meng Kho.

References

External links 
 

Oil and gas companies of Switzerland
Oil traders
Swiss brands